Mashaleng is a community council located in the Mohale's Hoek District of Lesotho. Its population in 2006 was 21,869.

Villages
The community of Mashaleng includes following villages

 Boikano, 
 Bulu-Bulu, 
 Ha Bolokoe, 
 Ha Janki, 
 Ha Keeke, 
 Ha Khapise, 
 Ha Khitšane, 
 Ha Lebitsa, 
 Ha Lehloibi, 
 Ha Lekhema, 
 Ha Lekhooe, 
 Ha Lipala (Sekhutlong), 
 Ha Mabalane, 
 Ha Mahase, 
 Ha Mahoete, 
 Ha Makhate, 
 Ha Malebanye, 
 Ha Maphohloane, 
 Ha Mapooane, 
 Ha Mokhatla, 
 Ha Mokhesi, 
 Ha Mokhethi, 
 Ha Mokoinihi, 
 Ha Mopooane, 
 Ha Mphaki, 
 Ha Nchoba, 
 Ha Ntikoane, 
 Ha Panta, 
 Ha Potsane,
 Ha Rakila, 
 Ha Ralekhetla, 
 Ha Ralitlhokoe, 
 Ha Ramoitoi, 
 Ha Raphiri, 
 Ha Raphokoane, 
 Ha Thekiso, 
 Ha Thoriso, 
 Ha Thuhlo, 
 Ha Tšepo, 
 Ha Tšepo (Ha Mokatse), 
 Ha Tšepo (Matlapa-Masoeu), 
 Ha Tšolo, Hleoheng, 
 Khuthong, 
 Letsoaing,
 Lihojeng, 
 Likhutloaneng, 
 Likueneng, 
 Lipeleng, 
 Majakaneng, 
 Majoe-Masoeu, 
 Makhapetla, 
 Makhineng, 
 Manyeleng, 
 Maqhena, 
 Marakong,
 Maseteling (Ha Makhate), 
 Matebeleng, 
 Matlapaneng, 
 Matsatseng, 
 Mohlanapeng, 
 Moreneng, 
 Motse-Mocha, 
 Nama-u-lule (Qhalasi), 
 Old Hoek, 
 Phahameng, 
 Pontšeng, 
 Qalakheng
 Thabeng.

References

External links
 Google map of community villages

Populated places in Mohale's Hoek District